Andrés Levin is a Venezuelan-born American record producer, bandleader, filmmaker, recording engineer and philanthropist. After several nominations, Levin won a Grammy Award in 2009 for his production of the In the Heights cast recording. His Grammy-nominated Latin fusion band Yerba Buena was founded along with Cuban-American singer Cucu Diamantes.

Levin has been called the "master-chef of urban fusion" by the Los Angeles Times.

Early life
Levin was born in Caracas, Venezuela. Since his father is a musician and producer as well, Levin was surrounded by music. He began playing guitar at age 10 and was soon immersed in the musical world. In 1988, Levin took advantage of a full scholarship at Berklee School of Music in Boston, Massachusetts before studying composition at Juilliard in New York City. While in New York, Levin worked at Skyline studios and was soon hired by producer Nile Rodgers as a full-time Synclavier programmer and arranger. With Rodgers, Levin worked with artists such as the B-52's, Diana Ross, INXS, and The Vaughan Brothers.

Yerba Buena
Together with Diamantes, Levin formed the band Yerba Buena. Before Yerba Buena, Levin had worked in several disparate genres, including R&B, soul, and Latin. Levin said that the same year the band was founded, he had been in Nigeria, Cuba, and Bahia... [and] those influences combined to form the Yerba Buena sound." Levin has also said that even though Yerba Buena "experiments with many influences, the basis of the group is inspired by the African and Cuban diaspora, where both worlds meet. The music is a bridge between the two cultures."

Film
In 2012, Levin produced his first film alongside Sarah Green, Amor Cronico. Directed by Jorge Perugorría
Since then he has been involved in feature and documentary films as producer, exec producer, associate producer or consultant such as : Guava Island (Amazon), Fate of the Furious (Universal), Habana Motor Club, and several documentaries for Amazon which he also directed.

Advertising
Levin has been involved in the music for advertising industry since 1995. In the fall of 2009 he launched Pirata (with Canadian partner Pirate) to provide sonic branding and audio post production for all aspects of broadcast audio, such as original music and licensing, sound design, full service radio production and 5.1 mixing. Since its creation, Pirata has provided work for Dr. Pepper, Verizon, Miller, Heineken, Cablevision, Kraft, Ritz, and Kohl's.

Discography

Studio albums

Film

Television

References

Living people
Venezuelan musicians
Latin music record producers
Year of birth missing (living people)